Cox Town may refer to:
Cox Town, West Virginia, an unincorporated community in the United States
Cox Town, Bangalore, suburb of Bangalore Cantonment, India